Aria is the seventh month of the Mandaean calendar.

It is the Mandaic name for the constellation Leo. It currently corresponds to Jan / Feb in the Gregorian calendar due to a lack of a leap year in the Mandaean calendar.

References

Months of the Mandaean calendar
Leo in astrology